The Iloilo State College of Fisheries (ISCOF) is a public college in the Philippines.  It is mandated to provide higher technological, professional and vocational instruction and training in fisheries, science, as well as short-term technical or vocational courses in fisheries. It is also mandated to promote research, advance studies, extension work, and leadership in its areas of specialization.  Its main campus is located in Barangay Tiwi, Barotac Nuevo, Iloilo.  There are other campuses in Barotac Nuevo (formerly known as Barotac Nuevo Polytechnic Institute), Dingle, Dumangas (formerly known as the Dumangas Polytechnic College) and San Enrique.   DYIS at 106.7 FM is a music and educational FM radio station operated by ISCOF at their main campus.

On January 10, 2023, Iloilo State College of Fisheries has been converted to a university thus adopting its present name, Iloilo State University of Fisheries Science and Technology.

References

See also
DYIS106.7 MHz FM Radyo Ugyon

State universities and colleges in the Philippines
Universities and colleges in Iloilo
1957 establishments in the Philippines